Shannon Stowers is a former Samoa international rugby league footballer who played as a  for the Auckland Lions in the NSWRL Premier League competition.

Playing career
Stowers played for the Hibiscus Coast Raiders in the 2002 Bartercard Cup.

In 2004 Stowers made two appearances for the New Zealand Warriors in the National Rugby League competition.

International career
He is a Samoa international.

References

1980 births
Living people
Auckland rugby league team players
Hibiscus Coast Raiders players
Marist Saints players
Mount Albert Lions players
New Zealand rugby league players
New Zealand Warriors players
People educated at St Paul's College, Auckland
Rugby league props
Rugby league second-rows
Samoa national rugby league team players